The Henschel Hs 129 was a World War II ground-attack aircraft fielded by the German Luftwaffe. The aircraft saw combat in Tunisia and on the Eastern Front.

A key requirement of the original specification was that the aircraft be powered by engines that were not in demand for other designs.

The design was relatively effective when it was first introduced, and saw service on the Eastern Front in a variety of front-line roles. As the war continued and anti-tank support became the main goal, the aircraft was continually up-gunned, eventually mounting a 75 mm anti-tank gun. Only a small number of these B-3 models were produced, late in the war.

Design and development
By the mid-1930s, the German military, as well as its counterparts in other countries, had come to see the main role of ground-attack aircraft as the interdiction of logistics and materiel, a task in which targets were often poorly protected and less likely to have strong, well-coordinated defences. For high-value, well-protected tactical targets, the dive bomber was becoming the conventional solution.

The experience of the German Kondor Legion during the Spanish Civil War (1936–39) refuted this idea. Even though it was equipped with types unsuited to the role, such as the Henschel Hs 123 and cannon-armed versions of the Heinkel He 112, the Kondor Legion proved that ground-attack aircraft were a very effective weapon. This led to support within the Luftwaffe for the creation of an aircraft dedicated to this role, and the Reichsluftfahrtministerium (RLM; "Reich Air Ministry") requested tenders for a specialized ground attack aircraft.

It was anticipated that the main source of damage to such an aircraft would be small arms fire from the ground, meaning that the plane had to be well-armored around its cockpit and engines. Similar protection was also needed in the canopy, in the form of 75 mm (2.95 in) thick armored glass. The aircraft was expected to be attacking in low-level, head-on strafing runs, so the cockpit had to be located as close as possible to the nose, in order to maximize the visibility of its targets. Another, non-operational, requirement severely hampered the designs: the RLM insisted that the new design be powered by engines that were not being used in existing aircraft, so that the type would not interfere with the production of established types deemed essential to the war effort.

Only four companies were asked to submit tenders; three submissions followed and only two of these were considered worthy of consideration: one derived from an existing Focke-Wulf reconnaissance type, the Fw 189, the other was Henschel's all-new Hs 129.

Prototypes
The Hs 129 was designed around a single large "bathtub" of steel sheeting that made up the entire nose area of the plane, completely enclosing the pilot up to head level. Even the canopy was steel, with only tiny windows on the side to see out of and two angled blocks of glass for the windscreen. To improve the armor's ability to deflect bullets, the fuselage sides were angled in, forming a triangular shape, resulting in almost no room to move at shoulder level. There was so little room in the cockpit that the instrument panel ended up under the nose below the windscreen where it was almost invisible; some of the engine instruments were moved outside onto the engine nacelles' inboard-facing surfaces and the gunsight was mounted outside on the nose.

Henschel's plane came in 12 percent overweight with the engines 8 percent underpowered; understandably, it flew poorly. The controls proved to be almost inoperable as speed increased and in testing, the V2 prototype flew into the ground from a short dive on 5 January 1940 because the stick forces were too high for the pilot to pull out. The Focke-Wulf  design proved to be no better. Both planes were underpowered with their air-cooled, inverted-V12 Argus As 410 engines and very difficult to fly.

The RLM nevertheless felt they should continue with the concept. The only real deciding factor between the two designs was that the Henschel was smaller and cheaper. The Focke-Wulf was put on low priority as a backup and testing continued with the Hs 129 A-0. Improvements resulted in the Hs 129 A-1 series, armed with two 20 mm MG 151/20 cannons and two 7.92 mm (.312 in) MG 17 machine guns, along with the ability to carry four 50 kg (110 lb) bombs along the fuselage centreline.

Hs 129 B-1
Even before the A-1s were delivered, the plane was redesigned with Gnome-Rhône 14M radial engines, which were captured in some number when France fell and continued to be produced under German occupation. The Gnome-Rhone radials were also made in versions with opposite rotation for the propeller, and were installed on the Hs 129 with the port engine rotating clockwise and the starboard rotating counterclockwise, as seen from nose-on, thus eliminating engine torque problems.

The A-1 planes were converted into Hs 129 B-0s for testing (although it has been claimed that some As were sold to Romania) and the pilots were reportedly much happier with the results. Their main complaint was the view from the canopy, so a single larger windscreen and a new canopy with much better vision were added, resulting in the production model Hs 129 B-1.

B-1 production began in December 1941 but deliveries were slow. In preparation for the new plane, I./SchlG 1 had been formed in January with Bf 109 E/Bs (fighter-bomber version of Bf 109 E) and Hs 123s and they delivered B-0s and every B-1 that was completed. It was not until April that 12 B-1s were delivered and the 4th Staffel (squadron) became ready for action. They moved to the Eastern Front (to Crimea) in the middle of May 1942 and in June they received a new weapon, the 30 mm (1.2 in) MK 101 cannon with armor-piercing ammunition in a centerline pod.

Hs 129 B-2
Deliveries of the new Hs 129 B-2 model began in May 1942, side by side with the B-1 (of which just 50 planes had been delivered at that point). The only difference between the two were changes to the fuel system – a host of other minor changes could be found almost at random on either model. These changes accumulated in the B-2 production line until they could eventually be told apart at a glance; the main differences being the removal of the mast for the radio antenna, the addition of a direction-finding radio antenna loop, and shorter exhaust stacks on the engines.

In the field, the differences seemed to be more pronounced. The Rüstsatz field refit kits were renumbered and some were dropped, and in general, the B-2 planes received the upgraded cannon pack using a 30 mm MK 103 cannon instead of the earlier MK 101. These guns both fired the same ammunition, but the 103 did so at almost twice the rate.

By late 1942 reports were coming in about the ineffectiveness of the MK 101 against newer versions of the Soviet T-34 tanks. One obvious solution would be to use the larger  BK 3,7 (Bordkanone 3,7), recently adapted from the ground-based 3.7 cm Flak 18. These guns had already been converted into underwing pod-mounted weapons for the Junkers Ju 87G and found to be an effective weapon, despite the fact that only 12 shells per pod could be accommodated. When mounted on the Hs 129, the empty area behind the cockpit could be used for ammunition storage, greatly increasing the supply compared to the Ju. The B-2/R3 package introduced the BK  automatic cannon, but relatively few aircraft were converted in favour of the B-3, mounting the BK 7.5.

Hs 129 B-3

It was decided that the  semi-automatic Rheinmetall PaK 40 anti-tank gun, which had already been adapted for use in the Junkers Ju 88P-1, would be further modified for use in the Hs 129. Fully automatic, it featured a new, hydraulic recoil-dampening system and a new, more aerodynamic muzzle brake. An autoloader system, with 12 rounds in a rotary magazine, was fitted in the empty space behind the cockpit, within the rear half of the wing root area. The gun and its recoil mechanism occupied a substantial gun pod under the fuselage, and a circular port at the rear of the pod allowed rearwards ejection of spent cartridges immediately after firing. While this new variant, the Hs 129 B-3, was theoretically capable of destroying any tank in the world, the added weight worsened the aircraft's general performance and it was inferior to previous variants.

The Bordkanone 7,5 was the heaviest and most powerful forward-firing weapon fitted to a production military aircraft during World War II. The only other ground-attack aircraft to be factory-equipped with similar-calibre guns were the 1,420 examples of the North American B-25G and B-25H Mitchell, which mounted either a  M4 cannon, or lightweight T13E1 or M5 versions of the same gun, both of which required a crew member to manually reload after each shot.

From June 1944, only 25 examples of the Hs 129 B-3 arrived at frontline units before the production line was shut down in September (a small number were reportedly also created by converting B-2 aircraft). In the field the B-3 proved effective, but its small numbers had little effect on the war effort.

Hs 129 C
To address the poor performance of the aircraft, plans had been under way for some time to fit the plane with newer versions of the Italian Isotta-Fraschini Delta air-cooled inverted V12 inline engine that delivered 630 kW (850 hp) and weighed some 510 kg (1,111 lb) apiece, providing more power than the Argus As 411 engine of similar configuration and lighter (385 kg) weight. The engine installation ran into a number of delays and was still not ready for production when the plant was overrun by the Allies in 1945.

Hs 129 D
Planned version of the Hs 129. Powered by either two  Junkers Jumo 211 or two  BMW 801 to improve its performance. No prototypes were made.

Operators

 Luftwaffe

 Royal Hungarian Air Force

 Royal Romanian Air Force

Specifications (Hs 129B-2)

See also

References

Bibliography
 Bernád, Dénes. Henschel Hs 129 in Action (Aircraft Number 176). Carrollton, TX: Squadron/Signal Publications, Inc., 2001. .
 Bernád, Dénes. Henschel Hs 129 (Military Aircraft in Detail). Hinckley, UK: Midland publishing Ltd., 2006. .
 Chorążykiewicz, Przemysław. Henschel Hs 129. Sandomierz, Poland/Redbourn, UK: Mushroom Model Publications, 2008. .
 Green, William. Warplanes of the Third Reich. London: Macdonald and Jane's Publishers Ltd., 1970 (fourth impression 1979). .
 "Henschel Hs 129...der geflügelte Büchsenöffner". Air International, December 1980, Vol 19 No 6. pp. 277–283, 303–304. .
 Kempski, Benedykt. Samolot szturmowy Henschel Hs 129 (Typy Broni i Uzbrojenia No.214) (in Polish). Warszawa, Poland: 2004. .
 Pegg, Martin; Creek, Eddie; Tullis, Thomas A. and Bentley: Hs 129: Panzerjäger! (Classic series, No. 2) West Sussex, UK: Classic Publications, 1997. .
 Smith, J.Richard. The Henschel Hs 129 (Aircraft in Profile No.69). Leatherhead, Surrey, UK: Profile Publications Ltd., 1966.
 Smith, J.Richard and Kay, Anthony. German Aircraft of the Second World War. London: Putnam & Company Ltd., 1972 (third impression 1978). .
 Stachura, Petr; Bernád, Dénes and Haladej, Dan. Henschel Hs 129 (in Czech). Prague, Czech Republic: MBI, 1993 (second edition 1996 bilingual Czech/English). .
 Wood, Tony and Gunston, Bill. Hitler's Luftwaffe: A pictorial history and technical encyclopedia of Hitler's air power in World War II. London: Salamander Books Ltd., 1977. .

External links

 German WW II manual for Hs 129B-3's Bordkanone BK 7,5 cannon installation

1930s German attack aircraft
Hs 129
World War II ground attack aircraft of Germany
Low-wing aircraft
Aircraft first flown in 1939
Twin piston-engined tractor aircraft
Anti-tank aircraft